Preston Overlook is a historic scenic overlook in Preston, Minnesota, United States, North America.

History
In 1937–38, the overlook was built by the Minnesota Department of Highways under the program of Federal Relief Construction in Minnesota.

The overlook was a product of its times. The Great Depression led United States President Franklin D. Roosevelt to create the New Deal, a complex package of economic programs initiated to help the economy recover and put people to work. The overlook was a project of one such plan, the National Reemployment Service. The original idea came from the Preston Women's Civic Improvement Club, which had lobbied for highway beautification. The overlook was designed by Minnesota landscape architect Arthur R. Nichols in the Rustic Style. The mosaic patterned wall and flagstone walk consist of limestone quarried from below the overlook.

In 2003, the Preston Overlook was listed on the National Register of Historic Places.

References

External links
 
 MNDOT Historic Roadside Development Structures Inventory: Preston Overlook

Buildings and structures in Fillmore County, Minnesota
National Register of Historic Places in Fillmore County, Minnesota
New Deal in Minnesota
Parks on the National Register of Historic Places in Minnesota
Roadside parks
National Park Service rustic in Minnesota
Arthur R. Nichols works
Scenic viewpoints in the United States